Roland Archer Nicholas Turvey (16 November 1931 – 26 March 2006) was a champion aerobatic and air show pilot in South Africa.

Career
Nick Turvey earned his flying wings in the South African Air Force in 1955. He later became Chief Instructor of the Johannesburg Light Plane Club, a popular flying club of that era. He was awarded Springbok Colours for aerobatics in 1965 and represented South Africa at the World Aerobatic Championships four times. In 1981, Turvey survived a crash in his red Pitts Special, ZS-ZAP at the Aviation Africa airshow, using his skills to avoid crashing into cars and spectators. He won the National Aerobatic Championships eight times.

Turvey was also a committee member of the South African Air Force Association (SAAFA) from 1963 until shortly before his death.

See also
 Aerobatics
 List of South Africans

References

South African aviators
Aerobatic pilots
1931 births
2006 deaths